Dear Bride is the fourth Japanese single of the South Korean boy group, BTOB. It peaked at number 2 on the weekly Oricon Singles Chart, selling almost 100,000 copies on the first week.

Album information
On January 13, 2016, BTOB released the information and track list for their upcoming Japanese single. The single is physically available in 3 regular CD types and a CD+DVD limited edition version. The music video, starring member Changsub, for the lead single was released on February 14, 2016. The group promoted the single on Japan from mid-February to early March.

Track listing

Chart performance

References

2016 singles
Japanese-language songs
2016 songs
BtoB songs